Bugga med the Streaplers is a studio album by the Streaplers, released on 18 October 2006.

Track listing
Mot en ny horisont
Just Call Me Lonesome
Kärleken har fått vingar
Du behöver bara be mej
Ett avslutat kapitel
Rock'n'roll Music
She's Still in Dallas
Louise
Ge mig en hundring till
Sweet Little Lisa
Things You Said to Me
Every Little Piece
Rock medley

Charts

References 

2006 albums
Streaplers albums